Cottontown is an unincorporated community and census-designated place (CDP) in Sumner and Robertson counties, Tennessee, United States. It was named for Capt. Thomas Cotton, a Revolutionary War veteran from North Carolina. As of the 2010 census, its population was 367. It is located along State Route 25 northwest of neighboring Gallatin. The area has its own Post Office. The United States Postal Service ZIP code for the Cottontown area is 37048.

As one of the first established communities in the state of Tennessee, this unincorporated community has a land area today of over 44 miles and 25,000 acres, containing a mixture of agricultural, institutional, and residential uses to the local residents within the rural community. The land area located within the borders of Cottontown is 44.0 sq miles. It is located along State Route 25, northwest of Gallatin. Learn more About Cottontown

Cottontown was founded in 1795 by Thomas Cotton. Cottontown was settled by pioneer settlers who received land grants from North Carolina to reward their service in the Revolutionary War. The first family land grant settlers of Cottontown were Cotton, Sutton, Briggance, Strother, Hassell, Cooley, Looney and King (more names may be determined). Cottontown Founding Settlers and Families

Today, a few of the pioneering settlers still have decedents in Cottontown. As a reminder of their brave pioneering spirit, the family names are found on tombstones in local cemeteries. Some cemeteries are easily seen and known; others are hidden amongst the trees. Each tombstone gives evidence they were once here. The beautiful hills and “hollers” they set out to conquer bear their names, as do the streams they got their water and the roads we now travel.

Captain Thomas Cotton 
Captain Thomas Cotton was born in 1748 in Halifax, North Carolina.

In 1785, the state of North Carolina granted Thomas Cotton, resident of Hertford County, North Carolina, 640 acres of land “in Davidson County south side of the Cumberland and waters of Stones River.” Two years later, he purchased 640 acres on the Little Harpeth River. In 1794, deed records show Thomas Cotton purchased 317 acres in Sumner County from James Sanders Jr. The 317 acres were located on Station Camp Creek.

By 1792 tax records show Thomas Cotton had 1,200 acres in Sumner County. (Tax list 1792 Sumner) He became known as the founder of Cottontown. According to Thomas Cotton’s will dated 1794, he deeded his son Moore Cotton 158.5 acres on the upper side of the land he resided on at that time.

Today, located on Hwy 25 in Cottontown, is a historical marker identifying a double pen style log home known as the Bridal House, built by Moore Cotton in 1819 for his only daughter, Elizabeth (aka Betsy). Betsy married Robert Hobdy. Robert Hobdy was an apprentice who worked in Moore Cotton’s blacksmith shop. He was Talitha Cotton Hobdy’s son. Talitha was Thomas Cotton’s sister.

A unique feature of the Bridal House is the size of the logs used to construct it. Legend has it that the unusually large 4ft in diameter yellow poplar logs were pulled from Bug Hollow by oxen on two wide-wheeled wagons lashed together. A man named Brigham from Ziegler’s Station was hired to hew the logs. (Collier)

Located beside the Bridal House is a red brick home referred to today by some as the “Long Horn Farm.” This house was supposed to have been built by Captain Thomas Cotton for his son, Moore. There is some confusion concerning the age of this house due to portions of the house being removed over time. At one time, it had a summer kitchen and was used as a dwelling until the main house was built. The bricks used to build the house were made on the farm. This information was furnished by Mrs. Jim Cotton Glover (a fifth generation removed from Captain Thomas Cotton). (Collier)

On November 17, 1843, Hugh Cotton (grandson of Thomas Cotton) sold 1 ½ acre land for $15.00 to build a school. The school was called the Duke School. *It was located where the Travis Burton Farm was located in 1979.

On July 18, 1887, William and Elizabeth Stone sold five acres of land to the school district for $150. Part of this 5 acres is the former grounds that current residents and Sumner Countians are familiar with today. The first school erected was two rooms. It was located on these five acres. When a larger school was needed, it was sold to a man by last name of Cooley. Mr. Cooley had the two-room school moved by steam engine to his plot of land up Bug Hollow. Mr. Cooley used this old schoolhouse as his dwelling. (Collier)

A new two-year highschool school was erected in 1914. There are residents that live in Cottontown whose family members attended the Cottontown school. There were sentimental connections to the old schoolhouse/community center that stands no more. It had been cared for by the community in the past. The exterior may have changed over the years, but it stood as a reminder of those of the past. Many loved it, even those that drove by it for years in their daily commute through Cottontown.

Sumner county deeds show many transactions of the Cottons and familiar family names in the area. Currently, there is no one with the surname Cotton in Cottontown area. Many of the descendants of Thomas and Priscilla Knight Cotton eventually married into original family settlers and families that would be in later. Descendants with familiar Surnames are still here today.

Cottontown Village 
Cottontown Village is the location of origin of Cottontown, Tennessee. Located on Highway 25 in Sumner County, this rural town is on a mission to preserve its beloved community and rich Tennessee history.

Preservation 
A small community with a large passion of preserving Cottontown’s deep-rooted history. The Cottontown country community is on a mission to preserve the community's beloved history and historic structures. Cottontown Development Resources

Protecting the natural resources of the Cottontown country community, its farms and property of Cottontown residents is critical to preserving, not only, Cottontown’s distinct character, but it’s rural way of life and history. Learn more and get involved.

• Cottontown residents stop demolition of historic post office and home in September of 2022. Cottontown Residents Stop Demolition of Historic Post Office and Home

• The Good Cemeterian travels to Cottontown to help community restore historic cemeteries in October of 2022. The Good Cemeterian Travels to Cottontown to Help Community Restore Historic Cemeteries

Notable Mentions
 King Homestead Historic homeplace is located in Cottontown just off of Hwy 25.

 The Bridal House is a historic log cabin believed to have been built in 1819. It was built by Moore Carter Cotton for his daughter Elizabeth Frances “Betsy” Cotton (1804-1852) as a bridal gift on the occasion of her marriage to Richard Hobdy (1794-1851). The Bridal House is located at 2315 Hwy 25 W in Cottontown, Sumner County, Tennessee 37408. The mailing address is: P.O. Box 9039, Gallatin, TN 37066.

References

Census-designated places in Sumner County, Tennessee
Unincorporated communities in Tennessee
Census-designated places in Tennessee
Unincorporated communities in Sumner County, Tennessee